Hermann Anton Joseph "Tonny" Kessler (20 April 1889 – 15 February 1960) was a Dutch football player. Kessler, along with brother Dé and cousins Boeli and Dolf, played club football for amateur side HVV Den Haag. Kessler won three caps for the Dutch national side between 1907 and 1913, scoring one goal. After playing alongside each other in a match against England in March 1913, the Kessler brothers became the first brothers to represent the Netherlands together in an international match.

References

External links
 Player profile at KNVB
 Player profile at VoetbalStats.nl

1889 births
1960 deaths
Dutch footballers
Netherlands international footballers
Footballers from The Hague
Association football forwards
Kessler family